The 2019 Milan Ciga Vasojević Cup is the 13th season of the Serbian women's national basketball cup tournament.,

The tournament was held in Loznica from March 16–17, 2019. Crvena zvezda Kombank won the tournament.

Qualified teams

Venue

Bracket

Semifinals

Crvena zvezda Kombank v Novosadska ŽKA

Radivoj Korać v 021

Final

See also
2018–19 Women's Basketball League of Serbia
2018–19 Radivoj Korać Cup

References

External links
 Official website 

Milan Ciga Vasojević Cup
Basketball
Serbia